"We Paid" is a song by American rappers Lil Baby and 42 Dugg. It was released as part of the deluxe edition of Lil Baby's second studio album My Turn, on May 1, 2020. A video was released a week later, on May 6. "We Paid" is a braggadocious song about the rappers' wealth and come-ups. Regarded as a standout cut from My Turn, the song received rave reviews from critics, with particular praise for 42 Dugg. On the chart dated July 11, 2020, the song became 42 Dugg's first top 10 entry on the Billboard Hot 100, peaking at number 10.

Background
According to 42 Dugg, the song came about after connecting with Lil Baby during the 2020 Super Bowl in Miami Gardens. On April 9, 2020, he uploaded a clip on Instagram previewing the song's music video. It was released on May 1, 2020, as part of the deluxe version of My Turn, included as the final track on the album. Lil Baby's line, "runnin' 'round in these streets, it was me and Marquise", refers to Dugg's middle name.

Composition and lyrics
The song opens with 42 Dugg's signature whistle. The track consists of a "lowkey" trap beat and kick drums, and sees Lil Baby and 42 Dugg blend their rap styles, with 42 Dugg employing slurred auto-tuned bars. Dugg raps the first verse, and, as noted by Complexs Jessica McKinney, utilises a rhythmic flow, while Lil Baby "speeds things up a bit with a dizzying delivery". 42 Dugg's opening line includes the lyrics "Fore I go broke like Joc", a reference to rapper Yung Joc, which HotNewHipHops Alex Zidel attributed to Yung Joc seen driving an Uber at the beginning of the year. Joc responded, saying he actually likes the song and is "far from" broke. Uproxxs Derrick Rossignol pointed out, "as the title suggests, the song is about the rappers having wealth, as they rap about things like cars and jewelry while honoring their upbringings, as the chorus  which they rap together  goes, 'Young turnt nigga from the D to the A / I'm rockin' with the Lions, yeah, I'm rocking with the Braves / Yeah, yeah, yeah, yeah, yeah, we paid'.

Critical reception
Alphonse Pierre of Pitchfork called it "one of the best rap songs of the year". ABC News Radio called the song a "banger". Alexander Cole of HotNewHipHop also called it a banger and said the track "is yet another gold star on 42 Dugg's ever-growing resume". In review of My Turns deluxe edition, Josh Svetz of HipHopDX praised 42 Dugg's appearance as "dynamic", while further complimenting Baby and Dugg's "superb chemistry", as they take "turns dunking on their opps like [Michael] Jordan and [Scottie] Pippen. Hypebeasts Patrick Johnson also applauded their chemistry for being on "top form", labeling the track a "standout" on My Turn, and stated: "The true standout here is Dugg's slurred auto-tuned bars". Complexs Jessica McKinney included it in their weekly round-up of Best New Music, also calling the track a standout on the album and said the duo make great teammates as they "take turns laying down sharp bars about their come-ups", with Lil Baby's delivery that "will leave listeners in awe". XXL also listed it among the best new songs of the week. Andrew  Unterberger of Billboard named the song a contender for Song of the Summer, writing: "We Paid' is a short, infectious banger motored by the pair's irrepressible lockstep energy and one of the year's most undeniable chorus hooks".

Commercial performance
The song peaked at number 1 on US Apple Music across all genres, dethroning Lil Baby's own "The Bigger Picture". It reached number ten on the Billboard Hot 100 and number 8 on the Rolling Stone Top 100. The video has also garnered over 180 million views as of November 20, 2020.

Music video
The song's official video, directed by KeeMotion, was released on May 6, 2020.

Concept
Set in Atlanta, the video stays relevant to its title, finding the rappers flaunting their riches and merging Atlanta and Detroit's (the rappers' respective hometowns) car culture. They are seen driving in their own black Hellcats, performing various manoeuvres, including donuts and burning out, while a grey Corvette that moves through the Hellcats makes an appearance. The video also documents a minor crash.

Awards and nominations

Charts

Weekly charts

Year-end charts

Certifications

References

2020 songs
42 Dugg songs
Lil Baby songs
Songs written by Lil Baby
Songs written by 42 Dugg
Songs written by Section 8 (record producer)
Song recordings produced by Section 8 (record producer)